Volodymyr Romanovych Kupchak (born 7 April 1978) is a Ukrainian energy scientist and politician who served as a People's Deputy of Ukraine in the 7th Ukrainian Verkhovna Rada from Ukraine's 84th electoral district.

Biography and Education
Volodymyr Kupchak was born 7 April 1978 in Ivano-Frankivsk. From 1995 to 2000 he studied at the Ivano-Frankivsk National Technical University of Oil and Gas and obtained a master's degree in the economics of oil and gas. He attended the same school in 2008–2010 and attained the same designation as Engineer of pipelines. In 2007 he completed postgraduate studies at the Vasyl Stefanyk Subcarpathian National University, obtaining a degree in demography, labor economics, social and economic policies. His Ph.D. is in economics. His dissertation topic was "The formation of tariffs for gas distribution companies".
Master of Engineering, Master of Law.
Doctor of Economic Sciences, Economics of energy and environmental economics, Full Professor.

Education

2016-2017
Law Degree (with honors),
Specialty – General Law, 
Western Ukrainian National University, Ternopil, Ukraine.

2012
Arbitration Manager Diploma,
International Academy of Finances and Investments, Kyyiv, Ukraine.

2009-2010
Diploma in Engineering, 
Specialty - Gas and oil pipelines, gas and oil storages – designing and building, 
Ivano-Frankivsk National Technical University of Oil and Gas.

2002-2006
Post graduate school,
Specialty - Demography, social economy, state social policy,
Vasyl Stefanyk Precarpathian National University, Ivano- Frankivs’k, Ukraine.

1995-2000
Master of Economics,
Specialty – Economics of oil and gas, 
Ivano-Frankivsk National Technical University of Oil and Gas.
Ranked Top 10 students.

DEGREES
2021 
Academician, 
Academy of Economic Science of Ukraine http://www.aenu.org/en/

2020 
Full Professor, 
Analytical and environmental economics.

2016 
Doctor of Economic Sciences, 
Economics of energy and environmental economics, state and regional energy security, 
Thesis: Strategic management of energy efficiency.

2016 
Associate Professor, 
International economics, marketing and management.

2011 
Philosophy Doctor, Economics of Oil and Gas. 
Thesis: Forming of tariffs of gas-transporting and gas-supplying companies.

Career

 October 2022 – till now 
Strategic Committee, Member,
International Boxing Association, Lausanne, Switzerland.
https://www.iba.sport/

 September 2016 – till now 
Head of the Board, Co-owner,
“Consultima Group” Ltd, Ivano-Frankivs’k, Ukraine,
Consulting and investments in the field of energy, financing, and GR of renewable energy projects.

 December 2020 – December 2021 
First Vice President
Ukrainian State Company “Fishing Company S. A.”, Road-Town, British Virgin Islands.
Company-owner of state international fishing fleet. Modernization and optimizing the Company, implementing the budgeting and control system, GR, defending the interests of State in the international courts.

 December 2018 – till now
Professor, 
Western Ukrainian National University, Ternopil, Ukraine,
Ivano-Frankivs’k Education and Research Institute of Management (https://www.wunu.edu.ua/en/), Chair of International Economics. Lecturing, and supervising research and scientific work.

 September 2017 – till now 
Professor, 
Lutsk National Technical University (https://lntu.edu.ua/en), Ukraine
Economics, Management, Regional Economy Membership in Scientific Council.

 September 2016 – 2020,
Professor, 
Eastern European National University (https://vnu.edu.ua/en), Ternopil, Ukraine.
Chair of Analytical and Environmental Economics Lecturing, supervising research and scientific work.

 May 2015 – December 2018, 
Chief Executive Officer, 
“VolynOblEnergo” PJSC (https://energy.volyn.ua/#gsc.tab=0), Volyn region, Ukraine
regional electricity transmitting and supplying company.
General management, crisis management, implementation of anti-corruption measures and policy, optimizing and restructuring of the Company, smart grids system implementation in the Company of 2780 professionals, 390 000 customers.

 November 2012 – December 2014, 
Member of the Parliament of Ukraine (https://www.rada.gov.ua/en)
Head of Basic industries and innovations Subcommittee.

January 2011 – November 2012, 
Vice Head of the Board, Chief Development Officer in the field of Energy,
Group of public companies “UkrLandFarming” PLC (https://www.ulf.com.ua/en/) and “Avangardco” IPL (https://avangardco.ua/).
Companies, which own and operate 650 000 hectares of land in Ukraine and are second world egg producer. 31 700 employees.
Implementation of renewable energy projects, the building of two bio-gas plants (20 MW each) in Khmelnytskyy and Kherson Regions, designing and financing of the network of 100 MW biogas/solar plants, international financing of the energy projects, taking part in IPO

 March 2007 - December 2010, 
First Deputy Head of the Board, Chief Operating Officer,
“Ukrainian Gas Financial-Consulting Group”, PLC. 
Company – the owner of 7 regional natural gas transporting and distributional companies – 7 regions of Ukraine, 17 000 employees, 3.2 million customers Building a holding and managing company, operation management, implementing the gas-losses decreasing system, building the network of 18 CNG-Stations, anti-corruption measures, GR, optimizing and restructuring the companies.

 September 2007 – December 2010, 
Chief Executive Officer,
“Ivano-Frankivs’k-Gas” PJSC, Ivano-Frankivs’k, Ukraine.
Regional natural gas distribution and transporting company. https://if.dsoua.com/ua/
The total number of employees – 3 460, 340 000 customers. 
General management, crisis management, implementation of anti-corruption measures, optimizing and restructuring of the Company.

Social Activity
 2022, October – till now
International Boxing Association IBA (https://www.iba.sport)
Strategy Committee member
 2022, February – till now
The International Assistance Headquarters for Ukrainians (IAHU, https://dopomoha.org.ua/en/about-us-2/)
Member, one of the founders, Official International representative
 2020 – till now,
Boxing Federation of Ukraine, Member of the Executive Committe, https://fbu.org.ua/federation.html?lang=en
2017 – 2020 
Representative from Ukraine to Women’s Commission of IBA (https://www.iba.sport), Lausanne, Switzerland.
 2016 – till now 
President, Volyn Region Boxing Federation, Ukraine
 2018 – till now 
Chief Operational Director of the Kyiv Energy Research Institute KERI, NGO, think tank, Kyyiv, Ukraine.
 2016 – 2020 
Co-founder of the International Social Project – KnygaDobra (Book of Good). 
 2010 - 2012 
Co-founder Kyiv International Energy Club “Q-Club”
 1996 – 2006 
Co-founder, President AEGEE-Ivano-Frankivsk, http://www.aegee.org .

References

https://fbu.org.ua/news/federation_news/2607.html

http://bug.org.ua/news/volodymyr/u-volodymyri-volynskomu-rozpochavsya-masshtabnyj-bokserskyj-turnir-233092/

https://volodymyr.rayon.in.ua/news/70155-u-volodimiri-volinskomu-vidkritii-chempionat-oblasti-z-boksu

https://www.lutskrada.gov.ua/publications/vidbulas-robocha-zustrich-shchodo-budivnytstva-khramu-u-volnovasi

http://tilkyrazom.com.ua/21400-2/

https://evnuir.vnu.edu.ua/handle/123456789/16582

https://euconlaw.com/i-pol-s-ko-ukrayins-ky-j-forum-vidnovlyuvanoyi-energety-ky/

https://www.volynnews.com/news/society/u-volynoblenerho-novyy-kerivnyk-154275/

http://w1.c1.rada.gov.ua/pls/pt/reports.dep2?PERSON=15765&SKL=8

https://www.kmu.gov.ua/diyalnist/provedennya-konkursiv/arhiv/konkurs-na-zajnyattya-posadi-direktora-byuro-ekonomichnoyi-bezpeki-ukrayini/kandidati-na-posadu-direktora-byuro-ekonomichnoyi-bezpeki-ukrani/kupchak-volodimir-romanovich

http://www.qclub.org.ua/ru/comments-experts/volodymyr-kupchak-pro-shlyahy-vyhodu-z-enerhetychnoji-kryzy/

https://www.linkedin.com/in/professor-kupchak-volodymyr-r-55564043

External links
 Volodymyr Romanovych Kupchak on the site of Verkhovna Rada
 3rd Energy Day, Channel 5, Window to Europe
 Volodymyr Kupchak Ivano-Frankivs'khaz VAT: Executive Profile
 Ivano-Frankivskhaz board chairman Volodymyr Kupchak. Electricity Commission Cancels Licenses Of Vinnytsiahaz Gas Distribution Company. Ukranews photoservice. Photobank.

1978 births
Living people
All-Ukrainian Union "Fatherland" politicians
Politicians from Ivano-Frankivsk
Seventh convocation members of the Verkhovna Rada
Lesya Ukrainka East European National University people
Vasyl Stefanyk Subcarpathian National University alumni